Puranpur  Assembly constituency is  one of the 403 constituencies of the Uttar Pradesh Legislative Assembly,  India. It is a part of the Pilibhit district and  one of the five assembly constituencies in the Pilibhit Lok Sabha constituency. First election in this assembly constituency was held in 1962 after the "DPACO (1961)" (delimitation order) was passed in 1961. After the "Delimitation of Parliamentary and Assembly Constituencies Order" was passed in 2008, the constituency was assigned identification number 129.

Wards  / Areas
Extent  of Puranpur Assembly constituency is KCs North, South, East, Jograjpur, PCs  Amraiya Kalan, Keshopur T.Anandpur, Khamaria Patti, Chandupur, Takia  Deenarpur, Puranpur Khas, Fazilpur of West KC, Kalinagar NP & Puranpur MB  of Puranpur Tehsil. Largest Village Sherpur Kalan.

Members of the Legislative Assembly

13th Legislative Assembly of Uttar Pradesh

See also
Pilibhit district
Pilibhit Lok Sabha constituency
Sixteenth Legislative Assembly of Uttar Pradesh
Uttar Pradesh Legislative Assembly
Vidhan Bhawan

References

External links
 

Assembly constituencies of Uttar Pradesh
Pilibhit district
Constituencies established in 1961